Garrison School may refer to:

 Garrison school, a type of school for children of Russian soldiers
 Garrison School (Rockford, Illinois), a former public grade school in Winnebago County, Illinois (NRHP #06000005)
 Garrison Middle School, a middle school in Baltimore, Maryland
 William Lloyd Garrison School, a school in Boston, Suffolk County, Massachusetts (NRHP #80000674)
 Garrison School Historic District, an area of Liberty, Clay County, Missouri (NRHP #00001607)
 Garrison Union Free School, an operating grade school in Putnam County, New York (NRHP #82001244)
 Any of three campuses of Garrison Independent School District in Nacogdoches County, Texas
 Kleist Museum, a museum in Frankfurt (Oder), Germany, whose building was formerly the Garnisonsschule ("Garrison School")
 Garrison Cadet College Kohat, a military cadet college in Pakistan